Saad Abdullah Al-Sheeb (born 19 February 1990) is a Qatari professional footballer who plays as a goalkeeper for Qatar Stars League club Al Sadd and the Qatar national team.

International career
He made his debut for the senior national team of Qatar in 2009.

He was a part of the 23-man Qatar squad that was crowned champions of the 2019 AFC Asian Cup. With Al-Sheeb starting in all of Qatar's seven matches, the team conceded only a single goal, resulting in him winning the 'Best Goalkeeper Award'.

Honours
Al-Sadd
 Qatar Stars League: 2012–13, 2018–19, 2020–21, 2021-22
 Emir of Qatar Cup: 2014, 2015, 2017, 2020, 2021
 Qatar Cup: 2008, 2017, 2020, 2021
 Sheikh Jassim Cup: 2014, 2017, 2019
 Qatari Stars Cup: 2010, 2019–2020
 AFC Champions League: 2011
 FIFA Club World Cup bronze medalist: 2011
Qatar
 AFC Asian Cup: 2019
 Arabian Gulf Cup: 2014
 WAFF Championship: 2013
Individual
 AFC Asian Cup Golden Glove: 2019
 AFC Asian Cup Team of the Tournament: 2019
 Qatar Stars League Team of the Year : 2017–18, 2018–19

References

External links

1990 births
Living people
Qatari footballers
Al Sadd SC players
Association football goalkeepers
Qatar international footballers
Qatar Stars League players
AFC Asian Cup-winning players
2011 AFC Asian Cup players
2015 AFC Asian Cup players
2019 AFC Asian Cup players
2019 Copa América players
2021 CONCACAF Gold Cup players
2022 FIFA World Cup players